Mark Lathrop (born 1950) is a Canadian Biostatistician. He headed the  Center for the Study of Human Polymorphisms, but returned to Canada as Scientific Director at McGill University and Genome Quebec's Innovation Centre in 2011.

Bibliography

References

Biostatisticians
21st-century Canadian scientists
Living people
1950 births
Academic staff of McGill University
People associated with the University of Oxford
Canadian geneticists